Juozas Paukštelis born Juozas Ptašinskas (2 March 1899, Titoniai, Kovno Governorate – 20 July 1981) was a Lithuanian author and translator. His works have been translated into Russian, Polish, and Kazakh.

After receiving a degree from Kaunas University in theology and philosophy, he spent much of his life in the city of Kėdainiai, where he hosted literary gatherings. His house there is now a museum. 

In 1985, the Juozas Paukštelis Award was established to honor the books that best describe rural life and its moral and social complexities.

Works
 Našlės vaikas (Widow's Child), 1932
 Kaimynai (Neighbors), 1939
 Vaiduokliai (Ghosts), 1953

References

1899 births
1981 deaths
People from Pakruojis District Municipality
People from Kovno Governorate
Lithuanian writers
Vytautas Magnus University alumni